Aakhri Sauda: The Last Deal is an Indian 2016 Bollywood thriller film, directed by Sandeep Kumar and produced by Mukesh Malhotra and Padmakar Athawale under the banner of Silver 9 Movies.

Zuber K. Khan and Tanvi Arora play the male and female lead roles respectively.

Cast
Zuber K. Khan
Tanvi Arora
Aaryan Chopra
Sonia Bajwa
Soni Jha
Mushtaq Khan
Ehsaan Khan
Prithvi Zutshi
Dev Malhotra
Anil Nagrath
Kailash Kaushik
Pentali Sen

Production

Filming
The principal photography of the film commenced sometime in 2015. The film was entirely shot in Mumbai.

References

External links
 
 

2016 films
Indian thriller films
2010s Hindi-language films
Films set in Mumbai
2016 thriller films
Hindi-language thriller films